Caitlyn Taylor Love (born June 16, 1994) is an American actress and musician. She co-starred in the Disney XD sitcom I'm in the Band. She is the voice of White Tiger/Ava Ayala in the Disney XD animated series Ultimate Spider-Man.

Career
Caitlyn Taylor Love was born on June 16, 1994, in Corpus Christi, Texas, and raised in Harlingen, Texas. She began pursuing an interest in entertainment at age 10, by competing in the Miss Texas Pageant Talent Division. She would end up winning that division in 2004. She was then invited in July 2005 to compete at IMTA New York where she won Miss Jr. Actress of the Year along with several other acting and singing awards.

Love then moved to Los Angeles, California where she was briefly a cast member of MTV's Punk'd, where she was involved in a prank on Rihanna. She would achieve more notability by competing on NBC's America's Got Talent appearing as semi-finalist in the show's first season.
In 2009, Love became a cast member of the Disney XD sitcom I'm in the Band.

Love has signed with Genuine Music Group and is preparing a master demo.
It will be called Bad Case Of Love Disease which is a song on the album written by JakeAce Rivers.

In 2012, Love joined the recurring cast of Ultimate Spider-Man: Web Warriors as White Tiger/Ava Alaya.

Filmography

Awards and nominations

Discography

References

External links
 

1994 births
Living people
Actresses from Texas
America's Got Talent contestants
American child actresses
American child singers
American television actresses
People from Harlingen, Texas
Singers from Texas
21st-century American actresses
21st-century American singers
21st-century American women singers